Anti-poetry is an art movement that attempts to break away from the normal conventions of traditional poetry. Early proponents of anti-poetry include the Chilean Nicanor Parra and the Greek Elias Petropoulos.

Parra, known as the father of anti-poetry, published his first collection of antipoems in 1954 and sought to reject the belief that verse holds any mystical power. The poems have been described as prose-like, irreverent, and illuminating the problems of human existence.

Elias Petropoulos had tried to describe the art of Anti-poetry. This was in his “notebook” in Berlin; containing verses that included intentionally made mistakes in regard to prosody, grammar and rhyme. The inspiration for many of Petropoulos poems had been the difficult atmosphere of the wall divided German metropolis where he was residing. Petropoulos had long come to the conclusion that poetry about love and desires was becoming too gentle for the literature of modern age. Rather it was time to introduce anti-poetry by incorporating anti-sentimentalism feelings and reaction within poems.

Early history
During 5th century B.C theatrical Sketches called Mimes were being introduced with ideas and languages that were determined to be Anti-plays. There had been times when poets would turn against his/her own poetry in an antagonistic way. Anti poetry can be found and cited from the first poets of Italy and also (Dante, followed by Petrarch) as well as some other places in Europe. They had made the decision to compose verses in vernacular rather than Latin; they were behaving in an anti-poetic manner. Many Playwrights which include both William Shakespeare and Moliere were some of the writers cited for using Anti-poetry within their work now and then in the midst of a verse play.

Modern Anti-poetry

Anti-poetry has been picked up in the 21st century. Modern anti-poetry carries the same spirit as the early writers, but is still distinct in nature. In modern anti-poetry, punctuation is minimal and only used as necessary. Formatting and capitalization are simple and friendly to the eye. It also incorporates new vocabulary and depicts poetic images and scenes.

Anti-poetry reading performance
Taking inspiration from Dada and performance poetry anti-poetry reading performances have gained momentum in the Prague, Czech Republic. The Prague-based performance and poetics collective Object:Paradise began in 2019 by Tyko Say with the mission to make "poetry readings more inclusive and inter-disciplinary and less restricted to art cafes and turtlenecks". Since then, the collective has hosted performance poetry events which feature a variety of disciplines happening at the same time to highlight "everything that happens at a poetry reading besides the poetry reading itself".

See also
Dada
Hungry generation

References

External links
The technique of anti-poetry, an essay by Edith Grossman

Poetry movements
1954 in literature